Bangour railway station was a railway station in West Lothian, Scotland. It was located on a short branch of the Edinburgh and Bathgate Railway.

History
Opened to serve a hospital in 1905, the station did not survive to the 1923 Grouping, being closed by the North British Railway in 1921.

The Bangour Railway as it was known began with an east facing junction at Bangour Junction on the Edinburgh and Bathgate Railway. The junction hosted several sidings, and was located where the A899 Livingston Spine road crosses the railway today. A station, with a single platform and two sidings existed at Dechmont. The line terminated near the present day boiler house in Bangour Village Hospital. The line carried all the supplies for the hospital, but quickly became redundant when road access improved throughout the area.
The line was funded by the Edinburgh and District Lunacy Board, and was classed as a private line.

Services

References

Notes

Sources

External links
 RAILSCOT on Edinburgh and Bathgate Railway

Disused railway stations in West Lothian
Former North British Railway stations
Railway stations in Great Britain opened in 1905
Railway stations in Great Britain closed in 1921